Le Quy Don High School for the Gifted can refer to:
 Le Quy Don High School for the Gifted, Danang, a high school in Vietnam
 Le Quy Don High School for the Gifted, Vung Tau, another high school in Vietnam
 Le Quy Don High School, Ho Chi Minh City, a high school in Vietnam